Melchior is the name traditionally given to one of the biblical Magi appearing in the Gospel of Matthew. There are many notable people with this name, or close variations.

As a first name
 Melchior Anderegg (1828–1914), Swiss mountain guide
 Melchior Berri (1801–1854), Swiss architect
 Melchior Broederlam (c. 1350 – after 1409), Dutch painter
 Melchior Cano (1525–1560), Spanish theologian
 Melchior Cibinensis, 16th century Hungarian alchemical writer
 Melchior Goldast (1576–1635), Swiss writer
 Melchior d'Hondecoeter (1636–1695), Dutch animalier
 Melchior de Polignac (1661–1742), French diplomat, Roman Catholic cardinal
 Melchior de Vogüé (1848–1910), French diplomat, travel writer, archaeologist, philanthropist
 Melchior Franck (1579–1639), German composer
 Melchior Grodziecki (1584–1619), Catholic saint
 Melchior Hoffman (c. 1495–1543), German-Dutch Anabaptist prophet
 Melchior Inchofer (c. 1584–1648), Jesuit who took part in Galileo's trial
 Melchior Klesl (1552–1630), Austrian bishop statesman
 Melchior Lengyel (1880–1974), Hungarian writer
 Melchior Lorck (1526–1583), Danish-German renaissance painter
 Melchior Miguel Carneiro Leitão (1516–1583), Jesuit, first Bishop of Macao
 Melchior Ndadaye (1953–1993), Burundian politician and president
 Melchior Nunes Barreto (c. 1520–1571), Jesuit, missionary in Asia
 Melchior Schildt (c. 1592–1667), German composer and organist
 Melchior Wathelet, Belgian politician
 Melchior Wathelet, Jr., Belgian politician
 Melchior Wańkowicz (1892–1974), Polish writer, journalist and publisher
 Melchior Weiher (1574–1643), Polish nobleman

As a middle name
 Henry Melchior Muhlenberg, (1711-1787), Lutheran minister and missionary 
 Henry Melchior Muhlenberg Richards, United States Military Officer
 John Melchior Bosco, (1815-1888), Catholic saint and founder of the Salesians
 Giuseppe Melchiorre Sarto, (1835-1914), Catholic saint, Pope (Pius X)

As a family name
 Arne Melchior (1924–2016), Danish politician, government minister, son of Marcus
 Bent Melchior (1929–2021), chief rabbi of Denmark, son of Marcus
 Carl Melchior, German banker, advisor for the financial and economic negotiations that began at the Paris Peace Conference, 1919
 Dan Melchior, British singer, songwriter, and guitarist
 Daniela Melchior, Portuguese actress
 Eberhard Melchior, German mathematician
 Eberhard Melchior (naturalist), active around 1700
 Ernst Melchior (1920–1978), Austrian football player
 Friedrich Melchior, Baron von Grimm (1723–1807), German author
 Hans Melchior (1894–1984), German botanist
 Hans Bøchmann Melchior (1773–1831), Danish naturalist
 Ib Melchior (born 1917), American science-fiction filmmaker, son of Lauritz
 Israel B. Melchior (1827–1893), Danish engineer, manufacturer and amateur photographer
 Lauritz Melchior, Danish operatic tenor, especially Wagnerian roles
 Marcus Melchior (1897–1969), chief rabbi of Denmark
 Michael Melchior (born 1954), Danish-Norwegian rabbi, Israeli politician and son of Bent
 Simone Melchior Cousteau (1919–1990), wife of undersea explorer Jacques-Yves Cousteau
 Tracy Melchior (born 1973), American actress

Fictional characters
 A character in Tom Stoppard's On the Razzle (play)
 One of three parts of the biological super computer in Neon Genesis Evangelion manga and anime
 One of three sages of Shevat in the game Xenogears
 A Ceyah immortal from the video game Kohan II: Kings of War
 A laptop/webgoblin in Kelly McCullough's Ravirn series.
 A cosmic being in the Ascended Master Teachings of Joshua David Stone
 A centaur character in Harry Potter and the Philosopher's Stone
 Melchior Mayvin, an antagonist in Tales of Berseria.
 As "Melkhior", the wizard in Knight Lore who will create the spell to cure Sabreman of his lycanthropy
 As "Melchyor", a character in the 2012 novel Unholy Night by Seth Grahame-Smith
 The Guru of Life in the game Chrono Trigger
 Melchior Boehni, a character in the novella Kleider Machen Leute by Gottfried Keller
 Melchior Gabor, the lead male character in Spring Awakening (play) and Spring Awakening (musical)
 Melchior Hazard, father of Dora and Nora in Angela Carter's novel Wise Children
 Melchior von und zu Panke, a character in the German TV series Binny and the Ghost
 Melchior Sternfels von Fuchshaim, protagonist in the Baroque German novel Simplicius Simplicissimus
 Melchior Tresich, the main protagonist of Ranko Marinković's novel Kiklop (1965)
 Melchior Wakenstede, the main protagonist of Estonian book and movie series Melchior the Apothecary by Indrek Hargla
 Wilhelm Melchior, fictional playwright and director in Clouds of Sils Maria

Other
 A Swiss robot that tells time by L'Epée Clocks

See also
Majcher

Masculine given names
Surnames from given names